The second Negro Southern League (NSL) was one of the several Negro baseball leagues created during the time organized baseball was segregated.  The NSL was organized as a minor league in 1945 and lasted until 1951.

League history 

Nine team owners met in February 1945 in Nashville, Tennessee, to form a new minor league named after an old minor league.  

The 1948 season received very little coverage in the press and is hard to piece together.  Additionally, a new league, the Negro American Association, formed and lured away at least four of the stronger teams, including the Atlanta Black Crackers.

The league did not organize for the 1952 season due to attendance figures being expected to be too low to be profitable.  The second Negro Southern League was dissolved after seven seasons.

Negro Southern League franchises 

Note: An "associate team" is one who is not a member of the league, but games played against them by league teams count in the league standings.

League champions 

Most seasons were split in halves, with the winner of the first half of the season playing the winner of the second half of the season in a formal league play-off that decided the Pennant winner.  For some years it is unclear if a split season was played and if the second half schedule was completed.  In the below list, the first half winner is noted with a raised "1" and the second half winner is noted with a raised "2".

 1945 Atlanta Black Crackers
 1946 Asheville Blues (won both halves)
 1947 Asheville1 defeated New Orleans Creoles2, 3g-2g
 1948 New Orleans Creoles (won both halves, reportedly)
 1949 Gadsden-Florida Tigers1 / Nashville Cubs2, no play-off reported
 1950 undetermined
 1951 undetermined

References

External links 

 Negro Southern League Museum Research Center

Negro baseball leagues
Defunct baseball leagues in the United States
Baseball leagues in Alabama
Baseball leagues in Arkansas
Baseball leagues in Florida
Baseball leagues in Georgia (U.S. state)
Baseball leagues in Kentucky
Baseball leagues in Illinois
Baseball leagues in Indiana
Baseball leagues in Louisiana
Baseball leagues in Ohio
Baseball leagues in Tennessee
Sports leagues established in 1945
Sports leagues disestablished in 1951
1945 establishments in the United States
1951 disestablishments in the United States